The Journal of Environmental Law and Litigation is a student-run law review published at University of Oregon School of Law. The journal publishes articles and essays about environmental law, natural resources law, and litigation relating to these fields.

History and overview
The journal was founded in 1986 by participants at the University of Oregon School of Law's Western Public Interest Law Conference. The founding editors intended for the journal to be a forum for scholarship relating to "citizen enforcement of public [environmental] laws." In 1994, the journal began publishing on a biannual basis.

The 2016 Washington and Lee University Law Journal Rankings placed the journal among the twenty five highest rated environmental, natural resources, and land use law journals. Additionally, the journal was ranked among the top eleven environmental, natural resources, and land use law journals most frequently cited by cases. Articles in the journal have been cited by the Second, Third, Eighth, and Ninth Courts of Appeals. Occasionally, the journal has published issues relating to symposia sponsored by the University of Oregon School of Law.

Abstracting and indexing 
The journal is abstracted or indexed in EBSCO databases, HeinOnline, LexisNexis, Westlaw, and the University of Washington's Current Index to Legal Periodicals. Tables of contents are also available through Infotrieve and Ingenta, and the journal hosts an archive of past issues on its website.

See also 
 List of law journals
 List of environmental law journals

References

External links 
 
American law journals
Publications established in 1986
English-language journals
Environmental law journals
Law journals edited by students
University of Oregon School of Law
Biannual journals